Abraham Buford (July 21, 1747 – June 30, 1833) was an American soldier. He was a Continental Army officer during the American Revolutionary War, best known as the commanding officer of the American forces at the Battle of Waxhaws. After the war Buford became a member of the Society of the Cincinnati of the State of Virginia.

Biography
Born in Culpeper County, Virginia, Buford quickly organized a company of minutemen upon the outbreak of war in 1775, eventually rising to the rank of colonel by May 1778. Assuming command of the 11th Virginia Regiment in September, he would be assigned to the ad-hoc 3rd Virginia Detachment in April 1780 and sent south to relieve the British siege of Charleston, South Carolina.

Buford's men were on the north side of the Santee River, unable to help during the Battle of Lenud's Ferry.

Forced to withdraw following the surrender of Charleston on May 12, the 3rd Virginia Continentals were trapped on May 29 by a British and American Loyalist force under Lieutenant Colonel Banastre Tarleton. When Buford refused Tarleton's demand to surrender, Tarleton ordered an assault which inflicted casualties so severe that the Americans tried to surrender. While Buford was calling for quarter, Tarleton's horse was struck by a musket ball and fell. This gave the loyalist cavalrymen the impression that the rebels had shot at their commander while asking for mercy, and thus engaged in what Tarleton later described as "a vindictive asperity not easily restrained"; many American soldiers were sabred to death as they attempted to give up. The incident became known as the Waxhaw Massacre, and became strong propaganda story in the southern states. From that time onward, "Tarleton's Quarter" (meaning give no quarter) was an American battle cry in the Southern theater.

Escaping on horseback with his remaining men, Buford was not found culpable for the action and continued to serve as an officer in the Continental Army through the Siege of Yorktown.  He eventually settled in the Bluegrass region of Kentucky, on military bounty lands in excess of several thousand acres, where he helped found that state's horseracing industry and where he lived until his death at his home, which he called "Richland" (National Register of Historic Places) in Scott County, Kentucky on June 30, 1833.

On Flag Day, June 14, 2006, descendants of Lieutenant Colonel Banastre Tarleton sold Colonel Buford's regimental flags, taken at the Waxhaw Massacre, at Sotheby's New York for over $5,000,000 (US).

Buford was one of six sons of John and Judith Early Beaufort (Buford), all of whom served with distinction as officers during the American Revolution.  Their Civil War descendants included Union Major Generals John Buford, who distinguished himself at the Battle of Gettysburg, and Napoleon Bonaparte Buford and Confederate General Abraham Buford.

References

Further reading
Boatner. Encyclopedia.  Marcus Bainbridge Buford. "The Buford Family in America," 1903.
Hayes, John T. Massacre: Tarleton and Lee, 1780, 1781. Fort Lauderdale, Fla: Saddlebag Press, 1997. 
Herringshaw, Thomas William. 1909. "Buford, Abraham". Herringshaw's National Library of American Biography: Contains Thirty-Five Thousand Biographies of the Acknowledged Leaders of Life and Thought of the United States; Illustrated with Three Thousand Vignette Portraits, p. 484.
Piecuch, Jim. The Blood Be Upon Your Head: Tarleton and the Myth of Buford's Massacre: the Battle of the Waxhaws, May 29, 1780. Charleston, S.C.: Southern Campaigns of the American Revolution Press, 2010.  

1747 births
1833 deaths
People from Culpeper County, Virginia
Continental Army officers from Virginia
Virginia militiamen in the American Revolution